Trirammatus is a genus of beetles in the family Carabidae, containing the following species:

 Trirammatus chaudoiri (Guerin-Meneville, 1838)
 Trirammatus ignobilis (Chaudoir, 1876)
 Trirammatus lacordairei (Dejean, 1831)
 Trirammatus loxandroides (Straneo, 1951)
 Trirammatus pseudharpalus (Emden, 1958)
 Trirammatus selkirki (Andrewes, 1931)
 Trirammatus skottsbergi (Andrewes, 1931)
 Trirammatus torqueotrochantus Will, 2004
 Trirammatus unistriatus (Dejean, 1828)
 Trirammatus vagans (Dejean, 1831)

References

Pterostichinae